Once a Lady is a 1931 American Pre-Code drama film directed by Guthrie McClintic and starring Ruth Chatterton, Ivor Novello and Jill Esmond. The film, produced and distributed by Paramount Pictures, is a remake of the Pola Negri silent film Three Sinners (1928). The film was the final attempt by British matinée idol Novello to establish himself in Hollywood.

Synopsis
A young Russian woman (Chatterton) marries a wealthy Englishman (Novello), and has a daughter with him. After she has an affair with one of his friends, she is forced to leave Britain and moves to Paris. Many years later, her daughter approaches her, needing her help.

Cast
Ruth Chatterton as Anna Keremazoff
Ivor Novello as Bennett Cloud
Jill Esmond as Faith Penwick the Girl
Geoffrey Kerr as Jimmy Fenwick
Doris Lloyd as Lady Ellen Somerville
Herbert Bunston as Roger Fenwick
Gwendolyn Logan as Mrs. Fenwick
Stella Moore as Alice Fenwick
Edith Kingdon as Caroline Gryce
Bramwell Fletcher as Allen Corinth
Theodore von Eltz as Harry Cosden
Ethel Griffies as Miss Bleeker
Claude King as Sir William Gresham
Lillian Rich as Jane Vernon
 Leonard Carey as Butler 
 Adrienne D'Ambricourt as Propriétaire

References

External links
Once A Lady, allmovie.com
Film poster

1931 films
American films based on plays
Films directed by Guthrie McClintic
Sound film remakes of silent films
Remakes of American films
Paramount Pictures films
Films set in London
Films set in Paris
Films set in Russia
American black-and-white films
American drama films
1931 drama films
1930s American films
1930s English-language films